Spyros Vrettos (Greek: Σπύρος Βρεττός, born 1960 in the island of Lefkada) is a Greek poet.  He later studied at law school in the University of Athens.

Works

References
The first version of the article is translated and is based from the article at the Greek Wikipedia (el:Main Page)

External links
Poems from Spyros Vrettos 

1960 births
Living people
National and Kapodistrian University of Athens alumni
20th-century Greek poets
Poets from Achaea
People from Lefkada
21st-century Greek poets
Greek male poets
20th-century Greek male writers
21st-century Greek male writers